The Erfenis Dam is an earth-fill type dam located in the Free State province of  South Africa, on the Vet River, near Theunissen. It was established in 1960 and its primary purpose is for irrigation use. The hazard potential of the dam has been ranked high (3).

See also
List of reservoirs and dams in South Africa
List of rivers of South Africa

References 

 List of South African Dams from the Department of Water Affairs

Dams in South Africa
Dams completed in 1960